John Bastard may refer to:

John Bastard (c. 1688 – 1770), architect, one of the Bastard brothers
John Pollexfen Bastard (1756–1816), MP for Devonshire
John Bastard (naval officer) (c. 1787 – 1835), Royal Navy officer, MP for Dartmouth
John Bastard (cricketer) (1817–1848), British cricketer

See also
John I Doukas of Thessaly, also known as John the Bastard
Bastard (surname), including a list of people with the surname
Bastard (disambiguation)